The Grand Teton Music Festival is a year-round classical music presenting organization in Jackson Hole, Wyoming. The non-profit organization was founded in 1962.

The primary season is a seven-week summer classical music festival. Over 200 classical musicians from more than 90 different orchestras and 40 institutions of higher learning participate in the summer festival. The Festival presents family events, chamber music, classical crossover artists, and orchestral concerts. In recent years, the Festival has also included year-round experiences with Winter Festivals, The Met: Live in HD opera broadcasts, community concerts, and lectures.

History
The Grand Teton Music Festival was founded in 1962 initially as part of the Jackson Hole Fine Arts Festival. Conductors Ernest Hagen and George Hufsmith led the orchestra as music directors until 1968 when the Fine Arts Festival selected conductor Ling Tung as their successor. Maestro Tung moved the concerts from Jackson Lake Lodge and the Jackson High School gym (referred to as "Symphony Hall") to a large tent at the base of Rendezvous Mountain in Teton Village. The Festival moved into a permanent structure at the base of Rendezvous Mountain in 1974. After Maestro Tung's retirement in 1996, Eiji Oue served as music director from 1997 to 2003. For the 2004 and 2005 seasons, conductor Peter Oundjian served as the principal conductor and artistic advisor to the Festival. In 2006 conductor Donald Runnicles began his tenure as music director, a position he currently holds.

A virtual event is planned for 2020.

Music Directors
 1962–1964: Ernest Hagen
 1965–1966: George Hufsmith
 1968–1996: Ling Tung
 1997–2003: Eiji Oue
 2006–present: Donald Runnicles

Programming
Grand Teton Music Festival presents 100 events throughout the year, including lectures (“Inside the Music”), free family concerts, chamber music, classical crossover concerts, orchestral performances, open rehearsals, and pre-concert talks.

The Festival Orchestra is a resident ensemble, which varies in size throughout the summer from 70 to more than a 100, depending on repertoire, and is made up of musicians from top-tier orchestras across the country. Each summer, the music director leads four of the seven regular Festival Orchestra Concerts, and each concert features a soloist.

The GTMF Presents Series offers a range of artists, all classically influenced, who perform in venues throughout Jackson Hole. The performances show different facets of the classical music genre by featuring visiting orchestral soloists in recital as well as popular musicians who have blended diverse styles.

The Met: Live in HD is a collaboration between the Grand Teton Music Festival and the Jackson non-profit organization, Center of Wonder. High definition broadcasts from the Metropolitan Opera are played at the Center for the Arts in Jackson throughout the fall and spring.

Movies on the Mountain is a family-friendly series of films, presented free of charge at Walk Festival Hall.

The Winter Festival, a four-day celebration, began in the winter of 2015-2016. The February festival features a variety of classical and crossover concerts, in-school performances by visiting artists, and lectures. The winter series takes place in venues throughout Jackson.

Grand Teton Music Festival began presenting an Annual Fundraising Gala in 2015 to support the Festival and its year-round activities with music programs in local schools. The 2017 guest artist was cellist Yo-Yo Ma.

Commissions and premieres
The Festival has seen an increase of premieres and commissions in recent years due to the importance the current Music Director Donald Runnicles places on new works.

Regional and world premieres at the Festival include:

Education and community outreach
The Festival partners with Jackson Hole organizations and school district to expose audiences of all ages to music. Grand Teton Music Festival conducts various yearlong programs, such as scholarships, Tune-Up, Open the Hall, and school visits.

The Festival’s flagship music education program is Tune-Up, which has supplemented the standard music curriculum in local band and orchestra classrooms since 2004. Tune-Up provides teachers who are practicing musicians with expertise and knowledge in a wide variety of instruments. Tune-Up teaching artists provide private lessons and facilitate rehearsals for Jackson Hole classroom bands and orchestras.

Every spring Grand Teton Music Festival also opens Walk Festival Hall to local band, orchestra, and choir students, to perform in a professional setting.

See also
 List of classical music festivals

References

External links
 

Classical music festivals in the United States
Festivals in Wyoming
Music organizations based in the United States
Tourist attractions in Teton County, Wyoming
1962 establishments in Wyoming
Arts organizations established in 1962
Music festivals established in 1962